The 1996–97 SM-liiga season was the 22nd season of the SM-liiga, the top level of ice hockey in Finland. 12 teams participated in the league, and Jokerit Helsinki won the championship.

Standings

Playoffs

Quarterfinals
 Jokerit - Tappara 3:0 (3:1, 6:5 P, 4:0)
 TPS - Ässät 3:1 (1:3, 7:4, 6:3, 4:2)
 HPK - Kiekko-Espoo 3:1 (3:0, 4:3, 2:3, 4:3)
 Ilves - JYP 3:1 (4:2, 1:6, 4:1, 5:2)

Semifinal
 Jokerit - Ilves 3:0 (7:3, 2:1, 4:2)
 TPS - HPK 3:2 (1:4, 3:5, 5:4, 2:1 P, 6:2)

3rd place
 HPK - Ilves 5:1

Final
 Jokerit - TPS 3:0 (3:2 P, 4:2, 4:0)

Relegation
First round
KalPa - Haukat 3–0 on series
Kärpät - Karhut 3–0 on series
Final
KalPa - Kärpät 3–0 on series

External links
 SM-liiga official website

1996–97 in Finnish ice hockey
Finnish
Liiga seasons